Hemant Katare is a politician from Madhya Pradesh, India. He was a MLA from Ater (Vidhan Sabha constituency). He is a son of former Home Minister and Leader of opposition of M.P. Late shri Satyadev Katare.

Legal affairs
Bhopal police booked the former Congress MLA for allegedly abducting, raping a journalism student. After a series of rape allegations against him, the MLA claimed that the complainant was blackmailing him. A classic example of how political power garnered nepotism is misused. He is the son of former leader of opposition Satyadev Katare.

Katare who stands accused of targeting and assaulting a Dalit was absconding for a while. He surrendered before the court in April and was granted bail on furnishing a personal bond of Rs. 100,000.

References

People from Bhind district
1985 births
Living people
Indian National Congress politicians from Madhya Pradesh